Dasygnathus is a genus of large scarab beetles found in Australia.

Species
 Dasygnathus blattocomes
 Dasygnathus dejeani
 Dasygnathus globosus
 Dasygnathus trituberculatus

References

Dynastinae
Beetles of Australia